Neriman Köksal (born Hatice Kökçü; 17 March 1928 – 23 October 1999) was a Turkish actress. She appeared in more than one hundred films from 1950 to 1996.

Selected filmography

References

External links 

1928 births
1999 deaths
Actresses from Istanbul
Turkish film actresses
Turkish stage actresses
Turkish television actresses
20th-century Turkish actresses
Deaths from cancer in Turkey
Deaths from breast cancer
Burials at Zincirlikuyu Cemetery